Kildeskovhallen is a sports venue in Gentofte in northern  Copenhagen, Denmark.

History
The original venue was designed by Karen and Ebbe Clemmensen and built in two phases. The swimming venue was built in 1966-1969. It was followed by two halls for ball games in 1970-1972. The complex was listed in 1998.

The swimming venue was expanded with a new 50 m pool and a hot water basin designed by Entasis in 2001.

Facilities
Kildeskovhallen is home ground for the basketball club SISU Copenhagen, Hellerup IK's handball side and Gentofte Volley.

The facilities for swimmers include a 25 m pool, a 50 m pool, a children's pool, a baby pool and a hot water basin.

Other facilities include conference rooms, a physiotherapist clinic, fitness centre and a restaurant.

References

Sports venues in Copenhagen
Listed buildings and structures in Gentofte Municipality